is a Japanese actor, voice actor and singer associated with Stay Luck. He began acting as a child and is sometimes mistaken with Daisuke Hirakawa, as their names only differ by one character when written in kanji. Despite his wide range of roles, he usually plays young heroes, such as Mikage in 07-Ghost, Fay D. Flourite in Tsubasa: Reservoir Chronicle, Jellal Fernandes and his counterpart Mystogan in Fairy Tail, Rokuro "Rock" Okajima in Black Lagoon, Jack The Ripper in Black Clover, Keita Ibuki in Black God, Goemon Ishikawa XIII in later instalments of Lupin the Third, and Yu Narukami in Persona 4. He has also been cast as anti-heroes or antagonists, such as Ulquiorra Cifer in Bleach, Hisoka Morow in Hunter × Hunter (2011), Kei Kurono in Gantz, Eustass Kid in One Piece, Dr. Genus in One Punch Man, Chōsō in Jujutsu Kaisen, Tōru Oikawa in Haikyuu!!, Kishō Arima in Tokyo Ghoul, and Momoshiki Otsutsuki in Boruto: Naruto Next Generations.

He is the official Japanese dub-over voice artist for American actor Elijah Wood and Canadian actor Hayden Christensen. He has also dubbed over some roles that were performed by other fellow actors such as: Leonardo DiCaprio, Tony Jaa, Edward Furlong, and Kevin Zegers in Japanese. He made his directorial debut for Wonderful World, a live-action film that opened in Japan in early summer of 2010. He also starred in the film itself, alongside Mamoru Miyano, Tomokazu Sugita, Tomokazu Seki, Rikiya Koyama, Yuka Hirata, Toshiyuki Morikawa, Kōichi Yamadera, Showtaro Morikubo and Yūko Kaida.

Personal life
Namikawa married in 2001. In 2017, Shūkan Bunshun reported that Namikawa had been involved in an on-and-off extramarital affair with a female employee from his previous agency since 2004, whom he met when she had still been a teenager. Namikawa later confirmed the report and apologized.

Filmography

Television animation
1993
Nintama Rantarou as Takamaru Saito
1996
Detective Conan as Shiro Ogata
1997
Kero Kero Chime as Aoi
1998
Yu-Gi-Oh! as Hayama
1999
Arc the Lad as Elk
2000
Saiyuki Reload as Kami-sama
Yu-Gi-Oh! Duel Monsters as Ryota Kajiki
2001
The Prince of Tennis as Chotaro Ohtori
Legend of the Condor Hero as Yang Guo
2002
Genma Wars as Jin
Wagamama Fairy: Mirumo de Pon! (Charming edition) as Setsu Yūki
Naruto as Sumaru
2003
Beyblade G-Revolution as Hitoshi Kinomiya
Dokkoider as Suzuo Sakurazaki/Dokkoida
Onegai Twins (Please Twins!) as Maiku Kamishiro
Ikki Tousen (Battle Vixens) as Toutaku Chuuei
Gilgamesh as Tatsuya Madoka; Terumichi Madoka
Maburaho as Mitsuaki Nanba
2004
Superior Defender Gundam Force as Guneagle, Hogaremaru
Hi no Tori (Phoenix) as Masato Yamanobe; Takeru
Kyo Kara Maoh! as Ryan
Melody of Oblivion as Kuron
Gantz: First Stage as Kei Kurono
Agatha Christie's Great Detectives Poirot and Marple as Constable Hearst; Chibo
Gantz: Second Stage as Kei Kurono
Beck: Mongolian Chop Squad as Yukio Tanaka
Major as Joe Gibson Jr.
2005
Tsubasa: Reservoir Chronicle as Fai D. Flourite
Honey and Clover as Rokutarō
Oku-sama wa Joshi Kōsei as Sonoda-sensei
Full Metal Panic!: The Second Raid as Leonard Testarossa
 Idaten Jump as Kyoichi Shido
2006
Utawarerumono as Benawi
Ouran High School Host Club as Tetsuya Sendou
.hack//Roots as Iyoten
Ray the Animation as Koichi9
Black Lagoon as Rock
The Story of Saiunkoku as Eigetsu/Yogetsu To
Fushigiboshi no Futagohime Gyu! as Toma
Musashi Gundoh as Musashi Miyamoto
The Third as Iks
Pokémon Diamond & Pearl  as Lucian
Bakumatsu Kikansetsu Irohanihoheto as Akizuki Yōjirō
Katekyo Hitman Reborn! as Giotto/Vongola Primo; Future Sawada Tsunayoshi
Tokyo Tribe2 as Kai
Black Lagoon: The Second Barrage as Rock
2007
D.Gray-man as Dodge
Bleach as Ulquiorra Cifer
Sisters of Wellber as Gallahad Eiger
El Cazador de la Bruja as Miguel
Blue Dragon (Anime) as Jiro
Hayate the Combat Butler as Schmidt hen Bach
Wangan Midnight as Koichi Hiramoto
Terra e... (Toward the Terra) as Leo
The Story of Saiunkoku Second Series as Eigetsu/Yogetsu To
Mononoke as Sogen
Shigurui: Death Frenzy as Gennosuke Fujiki
Mobile Suit Gundam 00 as Michael Trinity
MapleStory (anime) as Ariba
My Bride is a Mermaid as Yoshiuo Minamoto
2008
Persona -trinity soul- as Tōma Shikura
Spice and Wolf as Zheren'
Nabari no Ō as Thobari Kumohira Durandal
Blade of the Immortal as Araya Kawakami
The Mōryō's Box as Morihiko Toriguchi
Katekyo Hitman Reborn! as Giotto
Katekyo Hitman Reborn! as TYL! Sawada Tsunayoshi
2009
Hajime No Ippo: New Challenger as Itagaki Manabu
Kurokami: The Animation as Keita Ibuki
Hetalia: Axis Powers as Italy and Romano (South Italy)
Hanasakeru Seishōnen as Rumaty Ihvan di Raginei/Machaty Sheik di Raginei
07 Ghost as Mikage
Kimi ni Todoke as Shōta Kazehaya
Kobato as Ginsei and Fai D. Flourite
Fairy Tail as Siegrain/Jellal, Mystogan
One Piece as Eustass Kid
2010
Fullmetal Alchemist: Brotherhood as Young Hohenheim
Hetalia: World Series as N. and S.Italy (Veneziano and Romano)
Battle Spirits Brave as Barone The Moonlight
Senkou no Night Raid (Night Raid 1931) as Kazura Iha
House of Five Leaves as Masanosuke Akitsu
Sarai-ya Goyou as Masanosuke Akitsu
Mitsudomoe as Gachi Ranger Blue
Sengoku Basara II as Miyamoto Musashi
Doraemon as Johann Marusheru
2011
Kimi ni Todoke 2nd Season as Shota Kazehaya
Level E as Prince
Little Battlers Experience as Kazuya Aoshima
Gyakkyō Burai Kaiji: Hakairoku-hen as Seiya Ichijou
Yondemasu yo, Azazel-san. as Akutabe
Fate/zero as Waver Velvet
Persona 4: The Animation as Yu Narukami, Izanagi (I am thou)
Hunter × Hunter (2011) as Hisoka Morow
2012
Area no Kishi as Oda Ryoma
Aquarion Evol as Schrade
Daily Lives of High School Boys as Motoharu
Little Battlers Experience W as Kazuya Aoshima
From the New World as Squealer
Lupin the Third: The Woman Called Fujiko Mine as Goemon Ishikawa XIII
Magic Kaito Special as Gunter von Goldenberg (Spider)
Persona 4: The Animation as Yu Narukami
Hiiro no Kakera as Yūichi Komura
Fate/Zero 2 as Waver Velvet
Medaka Box as Koki Akune
Zetman as Jin Kanzaki
K (anime) as Isana Yashiro/Adolf K. Weismann
Kamisama Kiss as Dragon King Sukuna
The New Prince of Tennis as Chotaro Ohtori
2013
Valvrave the Liberator as Satomi Renbokoji
Hetalia: The Beautiful World as North and South Italy
Yondemasu yo, Azazel-san Z as Akutabe
Little Battlers Experience Wars as Rikuya Tougou
Devil Survivor 2: The Animation as Jungo Torii
Arata: The Legend as Hiruko
Brothers Conflict as Iori Asashina
Fate/kaleid liner Prisma Illya as Lord El-Melloi II (Waver Velvet)
Sunday Without God as Hampnie Hambart / Kizuna Astin
Servant x Service as Hasebe's dad
Ace of Diamond as Chris Yuu Takigawa
Gatchaman Crowds as Jou Hibiki
One Piece as Eustass Kid
Hakkenden: Eight Dogs of the East as Osaki Kaname
TRAiN HEROES as Aru
2014
Soredemo Sekai wa Utsukushii as Lani Aristes
Haikyū!! as Tōru Oikawa
Baby Steps as Takuma Egawa
Magical Warfare as Kazuma Ryūsenji
Persona 4: The Golden Animation as Yu Narukami
Shounen Hollywood as President
Space Dandy as Carpaccio
Tokyo Ghoul as Kishou Arima
Garo: Honō no Kokuin as Leon Luis
Yu-Gi-Oh! Arc-V as Leo Akaba 
The New Prince of Tennis OVA vs Genius 10 as Chotaro Ohtori
2015
Parasyte as Miki
Baby Steps Season 2 as Takuma Egawa
Garo: Guren no Tsuki as Fujiwarano Yasusuke
Gintama° as Hitotsubashi Nobunobu
Haikyū!! 2 as Tōru Oikawa
Hetalia: World Twinkle as North Italy
Kare Baka as Ponta Ninomiya
K: Return of Kings as Yashiro Isana
My Love Story!! as Hayato Oda
One-Punch Man as Pig God, Doctor Genus
Prison School as Jōji "Joe" Nezu
The Heroic Legend of Arslan as Narsus
Tokyo Ghoul √A as Kishou Arima
Ushio and Tora as Hyou
World Trigger as Kei Tachikawa
2016
Grimgar of Fantasy and Ash as Kikkawa
Twin Star Exorcists as Arima Tsuchimikado
Concrete Revolutio: Choujin Gensou Season 2 as Yoshiaki Satomi
Beyblade Burst as Zenkuro "Zac" Kurogane/Zac the Sunshine
Days as Hisahito Mizuki
ReLIFE as Nobunaga Asaji
Pokémon Sun & Moon as Rotom Pokédex
2017
Fate/Apocrypha as Lord El-Melloi II
The Ancient Magus' Bride as Lindel
Aho Girl as Dog
Tsuredure Children as Shinichi Katori
Hand Shakers as voice of god
Onihei as Tatsuzō
Katsugeki/Touken Ranbu as Oodenta Mitsuyo 
Black Clover as Jack the Ripper
2018
Hakata Tonkotsu Ramens as Jirō
Hakyū Hoshin Engi as Chuu Ou
Boruto: Naruto Next Generations as Momoshiki Ōtsutsuki
Hugtto! PreCure as Uchifuji
Touken Ranbu: Hanamaru 2 as Odenta Mitsuyo
Violet Evergarden as Gilbert Bougainvillea
Tokyo Ghoul:re as Kishou Arima
Pop Team Epic as Pipimi
Mr. Tonegawa: Middle Management Blues as Seiya Ichijou
Full Metal Panic! Invisible Victory as Leonard Testarossa
The Thousand Musketeers as Napoleon
2019
W'z as Fumiyuki
Meiji Tokyo Renka as Ogai Mori
Shinkansen Henkei Robo Shinkalion as Kirin
Demon Slayer: Kimetsu no Yaiba as Haganezuka
Kono Oto Tomare! Sounds of Life as Suzuka Takinami 
One-Punch Man 2 as Pig God
Star-Myu: High School Star Musical 3 as Touma Shiki
Magical Sempai as Maa-kun
The Ones Within as Ichiya Niki
The Case Files of Lord El-Melloi II: Rail Zeppelin Grace Note as Lord El-Melloi II
Kengan Ashura as Setsuna Kiryū
Ahiru no Sora as Katsumi Takahashi
Black Clover as Kirsch Vermillion

2020
Sorcerous Stabber Orphen as Childman Powderfield
ARP Backstage Pass as Eiji Kanō
Cagaster of an Insect Cage as Griffith
The 8th Son? Are You Kidding Me? as Alfred
Wave, Listen to Me! as Mitsuo Suga
Is It Wrong to Try to Pick Up Girls in a Dungeon? III as Dix Perdix
Digimon Adventure: as Yamato "Matt" Ishida 
BNA: Brand New Animal as Pinga
The God of High School as Park Mu-Jin
The Gymnastics Samurai as Shōtarō Aragaki
Pocket Monsters as Satoshi's Lucario, Koharu's Pokédex
Yu-Gi-Oh! Sevens as Otes

2021
Ex-Arm as Soushi Shiga
Mushoku Tensei: Jobless Reincarnation as Ruijerd Superdia
Re:Zero − Starting Life in Another World as Arch
So I'm a Spider, So What? as Black
World Trigger 2nd Season as Kei Tachikawa
Jujutsu Kaisen as Chōsō (ep. 24)
Hetalia: World Stars as Italy and Romano (South Italy)
Edens Zero as James Holloway
Scarlet Nexus as Kagero Donne
Tokyo Revengers as Haitani Ran
Takt Op. Destiny as Shindler
Lupin the 3rd Part 6 as Goemon Ishikawa XIII

2022
Salaryman's Club as Masahiko Utsugi
Fanfare of Adolescence as Yoshihisa Kuji
Eternal Boys as Tsuyoshi Imagawa

2023
Nier: Automata Ver1.1a as Adam
Tōsōchū: The Great Mission as Satoshi Tsukimura
Rokudo's Bad Girls as Masaru Hinomoto/Colonel
Fate/strange Fake: Whispers of Dawn as Lord El-Melloi II
MF Ghost as Daigo Ōishi

OVAs/ONAs
Mobile Suit Gundam 0080: War in the Pocket (1989) as Alfred Izuruha
Mobile Suit Gundam Unicorn (2010) as Riddhe Marcenas
Fairy Tail (2011) OVA 2 and 5 as Jellal Fernandes, Mystogan and Siegrain
Tokyo Ghoul: JACK (2015) as Kishou Arima
Final Fantasy XV: Episode Ardyn Prologue (2019) as Somnus Lucis Caelum
JoJo's Bizarre Adventure: Stone Ocean (2022) as Narciso Anasui, Anakiss
Lupin the 3rd vs. Cat's Eye (2023) as Goemon Ishikawa XIII

Unknown date
Iriya no Sora, UFO no Natsu as Naoyuki Asaba
Kyō, Koi o Hajimemasu as Kyota Tsubaki
Last Order: Final Fantasy VII as Turks (Rod)
Lupin: Blood Seal -Eternal Mermaid- as Goemon Ishikawa
Legend of Toki as Bat
Mobile Suit Gundam Seed Destiny Special Edition as Youlant Kent
Model Suit Gunpla Builders Beginning G as Boris Schauer
Murder Princess as Prince Kaito/The Dark Knight
Onegai Twins (Please Twins!) as Maiku Kamishiro
Sol Bianca as Rim
Someday's Dreamers: Summer Skies as Kouji Kuroda
Tsubasa Tokyo Revelations as Fai D. Flourite
Tsubasa: Spring Thunder as Fai D. Flourite
Yondemasu yo, Azazel-san. as Akutabe
The Prince of Tennis OVA: The National Tournament as Chotaro Ohtori
The New Prince of Tennis OVA as Chotaro Ohtori

Theatrical animation
Fair, then Partly Piggy (1988), Noriyasu Hatakeyama / Spencer Weinberg-Takahama
Zeta Gundam A New Translation: Heirs to the Stars (2005), Katz Kobayashi
Zeta Gundam A New Translation II: Lovers (2005), Katz Kobayashi
Pokémon: Lucario and the Mystery of Mew (2005), Lucario
The Princess in the Birdcage Kingdom (2005), Fai D. Flourite
Legend of Raoh: Chapter of Death in Love (2006), Bat
Zeta Gundam A New Translation III: Love is the Pulse of the Stars (2006), Katz Kobayashi
Legend of Raoh: Chapter of Fierce Fight (2007), Bat
Bleach: Hell Verse (2010), Ulquiorra Cifer
Hetalia: Axis Powers – Paint it, White! (2010), North and South Italy.
The Prince of Tennis: Tennis no Ouji-sama Eikoku-shiki Teikyū-jō Kessen! (2011), Chotaro Ohtori
Bayonetta: Bloody Fate (2013), Luka Redgrave
Hunter × Hunter: Phantom Rouge (2013), Hisoka Morow
Hunter × Hunter: The Last Mission (2013), Hisoka Morow
Lupin the 3rd vs. Detective Conan: The Movie (2013), Goemon Ishikawa
K: Missing Kings (2014), Yashiro Isana
Saint Seiya: Legend of Sanctuary (2014), Aquarius Camus
Boruto: Naruto the Movie (2015),  Momoshiki Ōtsutsuki
Crayon Shin-chan: My Moving Story! Cactus Large Attack! (2015), Mariachi
Gekijōban Meiji Tokyo Renka: Yumihari no Serenade (2015), Ōgai Mori
Digimon Adventure tri. (2015), Daigo Nishijima
Maho Girls PreCure! the Movie: The Miraculous Transformation! Cure Mofurun! (2016), Dark Matter and Kumata
Lupin the IIIrd: Goemon Ishikawa's Blood Spray (2017), Goemon Ishikawa
Doraemon the Movie 2017: Great Adventure in the Antarctic Kachi Kochi (2017), Professor Hyakkoi
Avengers Confidential: Black Widow & Punisher – Amadeus Cho
Lupin III: The First (2019), Goemon Ishikawa
A Whisker Away (2020), Tomoya Sakaguchi
Violet Evergarden: The Movie (2020), Gilbert Bougainvillea
Gekijōban Collar × Malice Deep Cover (2023), Takeru Sasazuka

Video games

1997
Everybody's Golf as Iceman

1999
Dragon Slayer Jr: Romancia as Prince Fan Freddy

2001
Growlanser III: The Dual Darkness as Slayn; Grey Gilbert

2002
Panzer Dragoon Orta as Mobo
The Lord of the Rings: The Two Towers as Frodo Baggins (Japanese dub)
Utawarerumono as Benawi

2003
The Lord of the Rings: The Return of the King as Frodo Baggins (Japanese dub)

2004
Prince of Tennis 2005: Crystal Drive as Chōtarō Ōtori
Prince of Tennis: Rush and Dream as Chōtarō Ōtori
Saiyuki Gunlock as Kami-sama
Sakura Wars: Mysterious Paris as Kojirō Akechi

2005
Beck the Game as Yukio Tanaka
Bleach: Shattered Blade as Ulquiorra Cifer
Gantz: The Game as Kei Kurono
Genji: Dawn of the Samurai as Minamoto Yoshitsune
Kenka Banchou as Yasuo Tanaka
Kino no Tabi II -the Beautiful World- as Sei
Sengoku Basara as Miyamoto Musashi
Prince of Tennis: Gakuensai no Oujisama as Chōtarō Ōtori

2006
.hack//G.U. as Iyoten; Hetero
Baten Kaitos II as Sagi
Bleach: Heat the Soul 3 as Ulquiorra Cifer
Blue Dragon as King Gibral
Genji: Days of the Blade as Minamoto Yoshitsune
Hiiro no Kakera as Komura Yuuichi
Kurohime as Zero
Otometeki Koi Kakumei Love Revo!! as Ayato Kamishiro
Sengoku Basara 2 as Miyamoto Musashi
Suikoden V as Main character A, Euram Barrows, Nick, Ernst
Prince of Tennis: Doki Doki Survival – Sanroku no Mystic as Chōtarō Ōtori
Tsubasa Chronicle Vol. 2 as Fai D. Flourite
Utawarerumono Chiriyuku Mono e no Komoriuta as Benawi

2007
Angel Profile as Mikhail
Another Century's Episode 3 The Final as Barrel Orland; Berckt
Bleach: Blade Battlers 2nd as Ulquiorra Cifer
Bleach: Heat the Soul 4 as Ulquiorra Cifer
Hetalia Academy as Italy
Hiiro no Kakera ~Ano Sora no Shita de~ as Komura Yuuichi
Hisui no Shizuku Hiiro no Kakera 2 as Komura Yuuichi
Kenka Banchou 2 Full Throttle as Akira Kisaragi
Mana Khemia: Alchemists of Al-Revis as The Other Vayne
Odin Sphere as Cornelius
Otomedius as Emon Five
Rezel Cross as Airu
Sengoku Basara 2 Heroes as Miyamoto Musashi
SD Gundam GGeneration Spirits as Katz Kobayashi, Narration
Prince of Tennis: CARD HUNTER as Chōtarō Ōtori
Prince of Tennis: Doki Doki Survival – Umibe no Secret as Chōtarō Ōtori

2008
Bleach: Heat the Soul 5 as Ulquiorra Cifer
Bleach: Soul Carnival as Ulquiorra Cifer
Bleach: The 3rd Phantom as Ulquiorra Cifer
Bleach: Versus Crusade as Ulquiorra Cifer
Duel Love as Yuki Jin
Mobile Suit Gundam 00 as Michael Trinity
Persona 4 as Protagonist (Yu Narukami)
Prince of Persia as Prince (Japanese dub)
Soukoku no Kusabi Hiiro no Kakera 3 as Komura Yuuichi
Star Ocean: Second Evolution as Claude C. Kenny
Super Robot Wars Z as Katz Kobayashi
Super Smash Bros. Brawl as Lucario
Way of the Samurai 3 as Protagonist
White Knight Chronicles as Leonard

2009
Bayonetta as Luka Redgrave
Bleach: Heat the Soul 6 as Ulquiorra Cifer
Bleach: Soul Carnival2 as Ulquiorra Cifer
Bloody Call as Cain
Dengeki Gakuen RPG: Cross of Venus as Naoyuki Asaba
Enkaku Sōsa: Shinjitsu e no 23 Nichikan as Itsuki Nanashiba
Hiiro no Kakera Shin Tamaihime Denshou as Komura Yuuichi
 Kimi ni Todoke ~Sodateru Omoi~ (Shota Kazehaya)
One Piece: Unlimited Cruise Episode 2 as Eustass Kid
Saikin Koi Shiteru? as Rei Kagami 
SD Gundam GGeneration Wars as Katz Kobayashi, Michael Trinity
Sengoku Basara: Battle Heroes as Miyamoto Musashi
Tales of Graces as Richard
Prince of Tennis: Doubles no Oujisama – Girls, be gracious! as Chōtarō Ōtori

2010
.hack//Link as lyoten, Adamas
Bleach: Heat the Soul 7 as Ulquiorra Cifer
Call of Duty: Black Ops as Chief Petty Officer Joseph Bowman
CLOCK ZERO ~Shuuen no Ichibyou~ as Takato Kaido/Akira Kaga/King
Estpolis: The Lands Cursed by the Gods as Hydekar
God of War III as Helios
Gundam Assault Survive as Michael Trinity
Mobile Suit Gundam: Extreme Vs. as Riddhe Marcenas
One Piece: Gigant Battle! as Eustass Kid
STORM LOVER as Mao Ikari 
Summon Night Granthese: Sword of Ruin and the Knight's Promise as Asnurz
Super Robot Wars Z II as Michael Trinity
Tales of Graces f as Richard
Zangeki no Reginleiv as Frøy

2011
Bleach: Soul Resurrección as Ulquiorra Cifer
Fairy Tail Gekitotsu! Kardia Daiseidou as Mystogan and Jellal Fernandes
Gachitora! The Roughneck Teacher in High School as Sho Ishikawa
Hiiro no Kakera Aizō-ban ~Akane-iro no Tsuioku~ as Komura Yuuichi
Hiiro no Kakera Shin Tamaihime Denshou -Piece of Future- as Komura Yuuichi
 Kimi ni Todoke ~Tsutaeru Kimochi~ (Shota Kazehaya)
One Piece: Gigant Battle!2 as Eustass Kid
SD Gundam GGeneration 3D as Michael Trinity, Riddhe Marcenas, Boris Schauer
SD Gundam GGeneration World as Katz Kobayashi, Michael Trinity, Riddhe Marcenas
Sengoku Basara: Chronicle Heroes as Miyamoto Musashi
Shin Megami Tensei: Devil Survivor 2 as Jungo Torii
Starry☆Sky ~after summer~ as Izuru Yarai
STORM LOVER: Summer Love!! as Mio Ikari
Prince of Tennis: Doki Doki Survival – Umi to Yama no Love Passion as Chōtarō Ōtori
TOKYO Yamanote BOYS DARK CHERRY as Jesus Rudou
TOKYO Yamanote BOYS HONEY MILK as Jesus Rudou
TOKYO Yamanote BOYS SUPER MINT as Jesus Rudou
White Knight Chronicles II as Leonard

2012
Armored Core V as RD
Assassin's Creed III as Ratonhnhaké:ton
Fairy Tail: Zeref's Awakening as Mystogan and Jellal Fernandes
Black Panther 2: Yakuza Asura Chapter as Ryusho Kuki
Brothers Conflict: Passion Pink as Iori Asashina
Dragon Age II as Hawke (Japanese dub)
Hunter x Hunter: Wonder Adventure as Hisoka Morow
Persona 4: Arena as Yu Narukami
 Persona 4 Golden as Protagonist (Yu Narukami)
Project X Zone as Rikiya Busujima
Resident Evil 6 as Jake Muller
Rune Factory 4 as Vishnal
SD Gundam GGeneration Over World as Katz Kobayashi, Michael Trinity, Riddhe Marcenas, Boris Schauer
Ys: Memories of Celceta as Ozma

2013
Brothers Conflict: Brilliant Blue as Iori Asahina
Dragon's Dogma: Dark Arisen as Julien
God Eater 2 as Julius Visconti
JoJo's Bizarre Adventure: All-Star Battle as Giorno Giovanna
Koibana Days: Pure Flower Garden as Tsubaki Saotome
Persona 4 Arena Ultimax as Yu Narukami
STORM LOVER 2nd as Mio Ikari

2014
Bayonetta 2 as Luka Redgrave
Etrian Odyssey 2 Untold: The Fafnir Knight as Flavio
Fate/hollow ataraxia as Waver Velvet
Gakuen K -Wonderful School Days- as Yashiro Isana
Hajime no Ippo: The Fighting! as Manabu Itagaki
J-Stars Victory VS as Hisoka Morow
Persona Q: Shadow of the Labyrinth as Protagonist (Yu Narukami)
Phantasy Star Nova as Reven
Super Robot Wars Z III as Katz Kobayashi, Riddhe Marcenas, Shrade Elan
Super Smash Bros. for Nintendo 3DS and Super Smash Bros. for Wii U as Lucario

2015
Bravely Second: End Layer as Yew Geneolgia
CLOCK ZERO ~Shuuen no Ichibyou~ ExTime as Takato Kaido/Akira Kaga/King
Fate/Grand Order as Zhuge Liang/Lord El-Melloi II, Hōzōin Inshun
God Eater 2: Rage Burst as Julius Visconti
JoJo's Bizarre Adventure: Eyes of Heaven as Giorno Giovanna
Persona 4: Dancing All Night as Yu Narukami
Reine des Fleurs as Louis
Root Rexx as Kaoru Kanzaki
Sengoku Basara 4 Sumeragi as Miyamoto Musashi
Shin Megami Tensei: Devil Survivor 2 – Record Breaker as Jungo Torii
Tokyo Ghoul: Jail as Kisho Arima
Utawarerumono: The False Faces as Benawi
Vamwolf Cross as Shuichi Aoi
Xenoblade Chronicles X as voice for Custom Male Avatar

2016
Black Rose Valkyrie as Asahi Shiramine
Collar x Malice as Takeru Sasazuka
Phoenix Wright: Ace Attorney - Spirit of Justice as Nayuta Sadmadhi

2017
Nier: Automata as Adam

2018
BlazBlue: Cross Tag Battle as Yu Narukami (Persona 4)
Super Smash Bros. Ultimate as Mimikyu, Lucario

2019
Kingdom Hearts III as Eraqus (young)
Final Fantasy XV: Episode Ardyn as Somnus Lucis Caelum
Sekiro: Shadows Die Twice as Sekiro
Saint Seiya Awakening as Capricorn Shura and Lizard Misty
13 Sentinels: Aegis Rim as Ei Sekigahara

2020
Another Eden as Zeviro

2021
Blazblue Alternative: Dark War as Kagura Mutsuki

2022
JoJo's Bizarre Adventure: All Star Battle R as Narciso Anasui
Cookie Run: Kingdom as Affogato Cookie
Bayonetta 3 as Luka

2023
JoJo's Bizarre Adventure: Last Survivor as Narciso Anasui

Tokusatsu
Tokusou Sentai Dekaranger (2004) as Leonian Gyoku Rou (ep. 47, 50)
Mahou Sentai Magiranger (2005) as Absolute God N-Ma (eps. 46 – 49)
Engine Sentai Go-onger (2008) as Engine Speedor
Engine Sentai Go-onger: Boom Boom! Bang Bang! GekijōBang!! (2008) as Engine Speedor
Engine Sentai Go-onger vs. Gekiranger (2009) as Engine Speedor
Samurai Sentai Shinkenger vs. Go-onger: GinmakuBang!! (2010) as Engine Speedor
Kaizoku Sentai Gokaiger (2011) as Engine Speedor
Ressha Sentai ToQger Returns: Super ToQ 7gou of Dreams (2015) as Track Maintenance Worker (Actor) /Tank Top Shadow (Voice)
Uchu Sentai Kyuranger (2017) as Cuervo (ep. 24 – 25, 38, 41, 44)

Film
Kami Voice (2011) as Kuon Kobayakawa 
Sono Koe no Anata e (2022) as himself

TV dramas
Koe Girl! (2018) as himself

Drama CDs

Amari Sensei no Karei na Seminar
Bleach Beat collection as Ulquiorra Cifer
Castlevania: Nocturne of Recollection as Alexis
Cinderella as Cinderella
DAISUKE! as Wakaba Daisuke
Dot Kareshi as Knight/Yuusha
Hetalia: Axis Powers as Italy; Romano
Itazura na Kiss as Naoki Irie
Kimi to Naisho no... Kyo Kara Kareshi as Takashi Yuuki
Lip on my Prince as Seiya Kitano
Lupin III as Goemon Ishikawa XIII
My Little Monster as Kenji Yamaguchi
Parfait Tic! as Ichi Shinpo
Requiem of the Rose King as Henry VI
Special A as Yahiro Saiga
Tsubasa Character Songs as Fai D. Flourite
Vanquish Brothers as Masamune
Voice Over! Seiyu Academy as Mitchell "Mitch" Zaizen

Dubbing roles

Voice-doubles 
Elijah Wood
The Lord of the Rings: The Fellowship of the Ring – Frodo Baggins
The Lord of the Rings: The Two Towers – Frodo Baggins
The Lord of the Rings: The Return of the King – Frodo Baggins
Eternal Sunshine of the Spotless Mind – Patrick
Green Street – Matthew 'Matt' Buckner
Bobby – William Avary
9 – 9
The Hobbit: An Unexpected Journey – Frodo Baggins
Maniac – Frank Zito
Grand Piano – Tom Selznick
Cooties – Clint Hadson
Over the Garden Wall – Wirt
The Last Witch Hunter – Dolan 37
I Don't Feel at Home in This World Anymore – Tony
Come to Daddy – Norval
Tony Jaa
Ong-Bak: Muay Thai Warrior – Ting
The Bodyguard – Wong Kom
Tom-Yum-Goong – Kham
Ong Bak 2 – Tien
Ong Bak 3 – Tien
Tom Yum Goong 2 – Kham
Furious 7 – Kiet
SPL II: A Time for Consequences – Chatchai
xXx: Return of Xander Cage – Talon
Triple Threat – Payu
Detective Chinatown 3 – Jack Jaa
Hayden Christensen
Life as a House – Sam Monroe
Star Wars: Episode II – Attack of the Clones – Anakin Skywalker
Star Wars: Episode III – Revenge of the Sith – Anakin Skywalker
Jumper – David Rice
Takers – A.J.
Vanishing on 7th Street – Luke Ryder
Outcast – Jacob
First Kill – William Beeman
Little Italy – Leonard "Leo" Campo
Star Wars: The Rise of Skywalker – Anakin Skywalker
Obi-Wan Kenobi – Anakin Skywalker
Justin Timberlake
Black Snake Moan – Ronnie Morgan
The Social Network – Sean Parker
Bad Teacher – Scott Delacorte
Friends with Benefits – Dylan Harper
In Time – William "Will" Salas
Runner Runner – Richie Furst
Palmer – Eddie Palmer
Leonardo DiCaprio
Romeo + Juliet (2000 TV Asahi edition) – Romeo Montague
Don's Plum – Derek
The Aviator – Howard Hughes
Blood Diamond – Danny Archer
Revolutionary Road – Frank Wheeler
Inception (2012 TV Asahi edition) – Dom Cobb
Nicholas Tse
New Police Story – Frank Cheng Siu-fung
Rob-B-Hood – Nicholas
Beast Stalker – Sergeant Tong Fei
Bodyguards and Assassins – Deng Sidi
The Stool Pigeon – Ghost Jr.
From Vegas to Macau – Cool
John Cho
Star Trek – Hikaru Sulu
Star Trek Into Darkness – Hikaru Sulu
Star Trek Beyond – Hikaru Sulu
The Exorcist – Andrew "Andy" Kim
Searching – David Kim
The Grudge – Peter Spencer
Jorge Lendeborg Jr.
Spider-Man: Homecoming (Jason Ionello)
Spider-Man: Far From Home (Jason Ionello)

Live-action films 
50/50 – Adam Lerner (Joseph Gordon-Levitt)
Alexander – Alexander the Great (Colin Farrell)
American History X – Danny (Edward Furlong)
Bad Boys (1999 Fuji TV edition) – Joe "Jo-Jo" (Michael Imperioli)
Black Panther: Wakanda Forever – Namor (Tenoch Huerta)
Bootmen – Sean Okden (Adam Garcia)
The Bronze – Lance Tucker (Sebastian Stan)
Bring It On – Cliff Pantone (Jesse Bradford)
Camp Rock – Shane Gray (Joe Jonas)
Cats & Dogs: The Revenge of Kitty Galore – Diggs (James Marsden)
Coach Carter – Damien (Robert Ri'chard)
Chaos – Shane Dekker (Ryan Phillippe)
Chitty Chitty Bang Bang (1989 VHS edition) – Jeremy Potts (Adrian Hall)
A Cinderella Story – Austin (Chad Michael Murray)
Cirque du Freak: The Vampire's Assistant – Steve "Leopard" Leonard (Josh Hutcherson)
The Cloud – Elmar (Franz Dinda)
Chronicle – Andrew Detmer (Dane DeHaan)
Clash of the Titans (2012 TV Asahi edition) – Perseus (Sam Worthington)
Crash – Officer Hanson (Ryan Phillippe)
Criminal Activities – Zach (Michael Pitt)
Dark Blue World – Karel Vojtisek (Kryštof Hádek)
The Dark Crystal (Blu-Ray edition) – Jen (Stephen Garlick)
Dawn of the Dead – Terry (Kevin Zegers)
The Day After Tomorrow – Sam Hall (Jake Gyllenhaal)
Day of the Dead (2020 Blu-ray edition) – Pvt. Miguel Salazar (Antoné Dileo Jr.)
Defiance – Asael Bielski (Jamie Bell)
Dr. Dolittle 2 – Eric (Lil Zane)
Dragon Blade – Yin Po (Choi Si-won)
dot the i – Kit Winter (Gael García Bernal)
Dude, Where's My Car? – Jesse (Ashton Kutcher)
Escape Room – Ben Miller (Logan Miller)
Escape Room: Tournament of Champions – Ben Miller (Logan Miller)
E.T. the Extra-Terrestrial (1988 VHS edition) – Elliot (Henry Thomas)
The Expendables 3 – John Smilee (Kellan Lutz)
F9 – Sean Boswell (Lucas Black)
Father's Day – Scott Andrews (Charlie Hofheimer)
Final Cut – Raphaël (Finnegan Oldfield)
The Forbidden Kingdom – Jason Tripitikas (Michael Angarano)
Freaky Friday – Jake (Chad Michael Murray)
The Goonies – Mikey (Sean Astin)
Guns & Talks – Hayon (Won Bin)
Hannibal Rising – Hannibal Lecter (Gaspard Ulliel)
Hart's War – Lieutenant Lamar T. Archer (Vicellous Reon Shannon)
He's Just Not That Into You – Alex (Justin Long)
Hot Rod – Kevin Powell (Jorma Taccone)
The Hurricane – Lesra Martin (Vicellous Reon Shannon)
I Am Not a Serial Killer – John Wayne Cleaver (Max Records)
Igby Goes Down – Jason "Igby" Slocumb, Jr. (Kieran Culkin)
I.T. – Ed Porter (James Frecheville)
Jason Bourne (2022 BS Tokyo edition) – Aaron Kalloor (Riz Ahmed)
Jennifer's Body – Nikolai Wolf (Adam Brody)
The Last Emperor (1989 TV Asahi edition) – Puyi (8 years old) (Tijger Tsou)
Leatherface – Jedidiah Sawyer / Jackson (Sam Strike)
Letters to Juliet – Victor (Gael García Bernal)
The Lookout – Chris Pratt (Joseph Gordon-Levitt)
Love & Other Drugs – Jamie Randall (Jake Gyllenhaal)
Mac and Me – Eric (Jade Calegory)
The Magnificent Seven – Chico (Horst Bucholz)
Man of Tai Chi – Tiger Chen Linhu (Tiger Chen)
The Maze Runner – Gally (Will Poulter)
Midnight Sun – Charles Reed (Patrick Schwarzenegger)
The Mighty Ducks – Charlie Conway (Joshua Jackson)
Mr. & Mrs. Smith – Benjamin "The Tank" Danz (Adam Brody)
The NeverEnding Story – Bastian Balthazar Bux (Barret Oliver)
Nicky Larson et le parfum de Cupidon – Poncho (Tarek Boudali)
No Time to Die – Logan Ash (Billy Magnussen)
North Face (2020 BS Tokyo edition) – Andreas Hinterstoisser (Florian Lukas)
Ordinary People (2010 DVD edition) – Conrad Jarrett (Timothy Hutton)
Our Times – Ouyang Fei-fan (Dino Lee)
Pacific Rim – Chuck Hansen (Robert Kazinsky)
Pandorum – Younger Corporal Gallo (Cam Gigandet)
Pecker – Pecker (Edward Furlong)
The Poseidon Adventure – Acres (Roddy McDowall)
Priest – Hicks (Cam Gigandet)
Prisoners (2016 BS Japan edition) – Alex Jones (Paul Dano)
Resident Evil: Extinction (2010 TV Asahi edition) – Mikey (Christopher Egan)
Resident Evil: The Final Chapter – Doc (Eoin Macken)
The Return – Andrei (Vladimir Garin)
Ride with the Devil – Jake (Tobey Maguire)
Road Trip – Josh Parker (Breckin Meyer)
Rogue – Neil Kelly (Sam Worthington)
Roman Holiday (2022 NTV edition) – Joe Bradley (Gregory Peck)
Salvador – Salvador Puig Antich (Daniel Brühl)
Sanctum – Joshua "Josh" McGuire (Rhys Wakefield)
The Science of Sleep – Stéphane (Gael García Bernal)
The Scorpion King 2: Rise of a Warrior – Mathayus (Michael Copon)
The Shining – Danny Torrance (Danny Lloyd)
Silent Hill: Revelation – Vincent Cooper (Kit Harington)
Sin City – Kevin; Cardinal Patrick Henry Roark; Yellow Bastard (Nick Stahl)
Sky High – Will (Michael Angarano)
Snow Queen – Kai (Jeremy Guilbaut)
Snow White and the Huntsman – William (Sam Claflin)
The Huntsman: Winter's War – King William (Sam Claflin)
Spy Kids 2: The Island of Lost Dreams – Gary Giggles (Matt O'Leary)
Spy Kids 3-D: Game Over – Gary Giggles (Matt O'Leary)
Stormbreaker – Alex Rider (Alex Pettyfer)
Superfly – Youngblood Priest (Trevor Jackson)
Taking Lives – Young Martin Asher (Paul Dano)
Temptation of Wolves – Jung Tae-sung (Gang Dong-won)
Terminator 2: Judgment Day – John Connor (Edward Furlong)
Terminator 3: Rise of the Machines (2005 NTV edition) – John Connor (Nick Stahl)
Time Bandits (1988 TV Asahi edition) – Kevin (Craig Warnock)
Time Bandits (35th Anniversary edition) – Kevin's father (David Daker)
Tom & Jerry – Cameron (Jordan Bolger)
Transamerica – Toby Wilkins (Kevin Zegers)
The United States of Leland – Leland P. Fitzgerald (Ryan Gosling)
When the Game Stands Tall – Terrance G. "T.K." Kelly (Stephan James)
White Oleander – Paul Trout (Patrick Fugit)
Witness (1987 Fuji TV edition) – Samuel (Lukas Haas)
Wrong Turn – Evan (Kevin Zegers)
X2 – Pyro (Aaron Stanford)
X-Men: The Last Stand – Pyro (Aaron Stanford)

Live action television 
And Then There Were None – Philip Lombard (Aidan Turner)
The Brady Bunch – Cousin Oliver (Robbie Rist)
The Blacklist: Redemption – Matias Solomon (Edi Gathegi)
Charmed – Chris Halliwell (Drew Fuller)
Counterpart – Claude Lambert (Guy Burnet)
Debris – Eric King (David Alpay)
Genius – Young Albert Einstein (Johnny Flynn)
Goosebumps (Let's Get Invisible!) – Max
Gossip Girl – Dan Humphrey (Penn Badgley)
Hannibal – Will Graham (Hugh Dancy)
His Dark Materials – Lee Scoresby (Lin-Manuel Miranda)
It – Henry Bowers (Jarred Blancard)
It Started With a Kiss – Jiang Zhi Shu (Joe Cheng)
Kindaichi Case Files Neo SP 1 – Byron Lee (Chun Wu)
Limitless – Brian Finch (Jake McDorman)
The Lost Symbol – Mal'akh (Beau Knapp)
Merlin – Merlin (Colin Morgan)
Playful Kiss – Baek Seung-jo (Kim Hyun-joong)
Roots – Chicken George (Regé-Jean Page)
Roswell – Michael Guerin (Brendan Fehr)
They Kiss Again – Jiang Zhi Shu (Joe Cheng)
Thunderbirds Are Go – Scott Tracy
Torchwood – Owen Harper (Burn Gorman)
What I Like About You – Henry Gibson (Michael McMillian)
World War Z – Andrew Fassbach (Elyes Gabel)

Animation 
The Adventures of Tintin – Tintin
An American Tail – Fievel Mousekewitz
An American Tail: Fievel Goes West – Fievel
An American Tail: The Treasure of Manhattan Island – Fievel
An American Tail: The Mystery of the Night Monster – Fievel
Arthur Christmas – Peter
Coraline – Wybie
DC Super Heroes vs. Eagle Talon – Flash
Dorothy and the Wizard of Oz – Scarecrow
Legend of the Guardians: The Owls of Ga'Hoole – Kludd
Luca – Ercole Visconti
My Life as a Courgette – Simon
My Little Pony: The Movie – Capper
Star Wars: The Clone Wars (film) – Anakin Skywalker
Star Wars: The Clone Wars (2008 TV series) – Anakin Skywalker
Star Wars Rebels – Anakin Skywalker
Trolls World Tour – Chaz

References

External links
Official agency profile 
Daisuke Namikawa at GamePlaza Haruka Voice Acting Database 
Daisuke Namikawa at Ryu's Seiyuu Info

1976 births
Living people
Japanese company founders
Japanese male child actors
Japanese male pop singers
Japanese male stage actors
Japanese male video game actors
Japanese male voice actors
Male voice actors from Tokyo
Tokyo International University alumni
20th-century Japanese male actors
21st-century Japanese male actors
21st-century Japanese singers
21st-century Japanese male singers